2 Minute Medicine, Inc. is a peer-reviewed and physician-led medical publishing and original news syndication company. It was founded in 2012 by Marc D. Succi MD, a physician at Massachusetts General Hospital/Harvard Medical School. 2 Minute Medicine is a content licensing group, licensing their content to industry companies, libraries, and higher-education institutions including Harvard University. They license their content through a system known as the 2 Minute Medicine Syndication Engine. Their textbook arm, the 2 Minute Medicine Physician Press, publishes various education textbooks including the Classics in Medicine and The Classics in Radiology.

References 

2012 establishments in Massachusetts